Joshua David Sharpless (born January 1, 1981) is a former Major League Baseball right-handed relief pitcher. Sharpless grew up in the greater Pittsburgh area, attending Freedom Area Senior High School in Freedom, Pennsylvania. Drafted in the 24th round of the 2003 Major League Baseball Draft out of Allegheny College, he progressed through the Pirates minor league system in three years.

He reached the majors on August 1, when trade-deadline moves left openings in the major league roster. He made his first appearance on August 2, 2006.  Sharpless continued to live in the Pittsburgh area year-round while playing for the Pirates.

After being released by the Pirates on March 31, Sharpless signed a minor league contract with the San Francisco Giants on April 10, 2008.  After becoming a free agent following the 2008 season, Sharpless signed with the York Revolution of the Atlantic League for the 2009 season.

He continues to live in the Pittsburgh area and gives pitching lessons to area high schoolers.

References

External links

1981 births
Living people
Major League Baseball pitchers
Baseball players from Pennsylvania
People from Beaver, Pennsylvania
Pittsburgh Pirates players
Williamsport Crosscutters players
Hickory Crawdads players
Lynchburg Hillcats players
Altoona Curve players
Indianapolis Indians players
Connecticut Defenders players
York Revolution players
Allegheny Gators baseball players